Centime (from ) is French for "cent", and is used in English as the name of the fraction currency in several Francophone countries (including Switzerland, Algeria, Belgium, Morocco and France).

In France, the usage of centime goes back to the introduction of the decimal monetary system under Napoleon. This system aimed at replacing non-decimal fractions of older coins. A five-centime coin was known as a sou, i.e. a solidus or shilling.

In Francophone Canada  of a Canadian dollar is officially known as a cent (pronounced /sɛnt/) in both English and French. However, in practice, the form of cenne (pronounced /sɛn/) has completely replaced the official cent. Spoken and written use of the official form cent in Francophone Canada is exceptionally uncommon.
In the Canadian French vernacular sou, sou noir ( means "black" in French), cenne, and cenne noire are all widely known, used, and accepted monikers when referring to either  of a Canadian dollar or the 1¢ coin (colloquially known as a "penny" in North American English).

Subdivision of euro: cent or centime?
In the European community, cent is the official name for one hundredth of a euro. However, in French-speaking countries, the word centime is the preferred term. The Superior Council of the French language of Belgium recommended in 2001 the use of centime, since cent is also the French word for "hundred". An analogous decision was published in the Journal officiel in France (2 December 1997).

In Morocco, dirhams are divided into 100 centimes and one may find prices in the country quoted in centimes rather than in dirhams. Sometimes centimes are known as francs or, in former Spanish areas, pesetas.

Usage
A centime is one-hundredth of the following basic monetary units:

Current
 Algerian dinar
 Burundian franc
 CFP franc
 CFA franc
 Comorian franc
 Congolese franc
 Djiboutian franc
 Ethiopian birr (as santim)
 Guinean franc
 Haitian gourde
 Moroccan dirham
 Rwandan franc
 Swiss franc (by French and English speakers only; Italian speakers use centesimo. See Rappen)

Obsolete

 Algerian franc
 Belgian franc
 Cambodian franc
 French Camerounian franc
 French Guianan franc
 French franc
 Guadeloupe franc
 Katangese franc
 Latvian lats (Latvian: santīms)
 Luxembourgish franc
 Malagasy franc
 Malian franc
 Martinique franc
 Monegasque franc
 Moroccan franc
 New Hebrides franc
 Réunion franc
 Spanish Peseta
 Tunisian franc
 Westphalian frank

References

Marianne (personification)